Dănuţ Moisescu (born 22 March 1972) is a retired Romanian football midfielder.

International career
Dănuţ Moisescu played four friendly games for Romania, making his debut under coach Cornel Dinu who sent him on the field in order to replace Gheorghe Mihali in the 48th minute of a 3–0 loss against Ecuador.

Honours
FC Universitatea Craiova
Cupa României: 1992–93

References

External links

1972 births
Living people
Romanian footballers
FCV Farul Constanța players
CS Universitatea Craiova players
Hapoel Tel Aviv F.C. players
Hapoel Be'er Sheva F.C. players
FC Dinamo București players
FC Progresul București players
Altay S.K. footballers
Liga I players
Süper Lig players
Israeli Premier League players
Association football midfielders
Romanian expatriate footballers
Expatriate footballers in Israel
Romanian expatriate sportspeople in Israel
Expatriate footballers in Turkey
Romanian expatriate sportspeople in Turkey
Romania international footballers
Sportspeople from Constanța